The Cotton States League name was used five times in baseball history. The first Cotton States League ran from 1902 through 1908 as a class D league. After the league shut down, another Cotton States League was reformulated in 1910, with three of the six '08 members returning for the new campaign and three new teams joining them. This league ran for four seasons, through 1913.

In 1922, the Cotton States League regrouped after nine years out of existence. This time, despite disbanding July 24, 1923 and resuming the next year, the league held itself together for 11 seasons before folding for good on July 13, 1932. The next revival of the CSL took place in 1936 and lasted six seasons before collapsing, before many other minor leagues did when World War II began. This time, it operated as a class C circuit. The league was reestablished in 1947. Again placed as a class C league, the Cotton States League survived through 1955 before folding for the fifth time in less than half a century. In 1953 the Cotton States League tried to evict the Hot Springs Bathers for attempting to include a black player, Jim Tugerson.

Cotton States League timeline

1902–1913
Cities represented/Teams/Seasons

1922–1932
Cities represented/Teams/Seasons

1936–1955

Championship teams

First stage (1902–1908)
 1902 – Natchez Indians
 1903 – Baton Rouge Cajuns
 1904 – Pine Bluff Lumbermen 
 1905 – Greenville Cotton Pickers
 1906 – Mobile Sea Gulls 
 1907 – Mobile Sea Gulls 
 1908 – Jackson Senators
 1909 – The league did not play

Second stage (1909–1913)
 1910 – Greenwood Scouts
 1911 – Vicksburg Hill Billies 
 1912 – Vicksburg Hill Billies *
 1913 – Jackson Lawmakers
 * Greenwood Scouts was declared champion as first half champion Vicksburg had disbanded.
 From 1914 through 1921 the league did not play

Third stage (1922–1932)
 1922 – Greenwood IndiansPlayoff: Greenwood beat Meridian, four to zero games
 1923 – Greenville Swamp AngelsNo playoff after the league disbanded
 1924 – Hattiesburg Hubmen
 1925 – Meridian Mets 
 1926 – Hattiesburg Pinetoppers
 1927 – Jackson Red SoxPlayoff: Jackson beat Monroe, four to one games
 1928 – Jackson Red SoxPlayoffs:Hattiesburg Pinetoppers beat Meridian, four to one gamesVicksburg Hill Billies beat Jackson, four to two gamesFinal series: Vicksburg beat Hattiesburg, four to three games
 1929 – Alexandria RedsPlayoffs:El Dorado Lions beat Laurel, four to one gamesJackson Red Sox beat Alexandria, four to two gamesFinal series: El Dorado beat Jackson, four to one games
 1930 – El Dorado LionsPlayoff: Pine Bluff Judges beat El Dorado, four to three games
 1931 – Jackson Red SoxPlayoff: Jackson beat Vicksburg, four to zero games
 1932 – Baton Rouge SenatorsNo playoff after the disbanding of the league
 From 1933 through 1935 the league did not play

Fourth stage (1936–1941)
 1936 – Greenwood GiantsPlayoffs:El Dorado Lions beat Greenwood, three to one gamesGreenville Bucks beat Pine Bluff, three to one gamesFinal series: El Dorado beat Greenville, four to one games
 1937 – Pine Bluff JudgesPlayoffs:Pine Bluff beat Greenville, four to one gamesEl Dorado beat Greenwood, four to one gamesFinal series:  El Dorado beat Pine Bluff, four to one games
 1938 – Greenville BucksPlayoffs:Monroe White Sox beat Helena, three to one gamesGreenville beat El Dorado, three to one gamesFinal series: Monroe beat Greenville, four to two games
 1939 – Monroe White SoxPlayoffs:Hot Springs Bathers beat Monroe, three to two gamesGreenville Buckshots beat Clarksdale, three to one gamesFinal series: Greenville beat Hot Springs, four to one games
 1940 – Monroe White SoxPlayoffs:Monroe beat Greenville, three to one gamesEl Dorado Oilers beat Helena, three to one gamesFinal series: Monroe beat El Dorado, four to one games
 1941 – Monroe White SoxPlayoffs:Vicksburg Hill Billies beat Monroe, three to two gamesHot Springs Bathers beat Greenville, three to zero gamesFinal series: Hot Springs beat Vicksburg, four to zero games
 From 1942 through 1946 the league did not play

Fifth stage (1947–1955)
 1947 – Greenwood DodgersPlayoffs:Greenwood beat Clarksdale, three to one gamesGreenville Bucks beat El Dorado, three to two gamesFinal series: Greenwood beat Greenville, four to three games
 1948 – Greenwood DodgersPlayoffs:Greenwood beat Natchez, three to zero gamesHot Springs Bathers beat Clarksdale, three to zero gamesFinal series: Hot Springs beat Greenwood, four to three games
 1949 – Greenwood DodgersPlayoffs:Natchez Indians beat El Dorado, four to three gamesPine Bluff Cardinals beat Greenwood, four to two gamesFinal series: Natchez beat Pine Bluff, four to one games
 1950 – Pine Bluff JudgesPlayoffs:Hot Springs Bathers beat Monroe, four to two gamesNatchez Indians beat Pine Bluff, four to one gamesFinal series: Hot Springs beat Natchez, four to three games
 1951 – Monroe SportsPlayoffs:Natchez Indians beat Monroe, four to three gamesPine Bluff Judges beat Greenwood, four to three gamesFinal series: Natchez beat Pine Bluff, four to one games
 1952 – Meridian MillersPlayoffs:Meridian beat Monroe, four to two gamesNatchez Indians beat Greenwood, four to two gamesFinal series: Meridian beat Natchez, four to three games
 1953 – Meridian MillersPlayoffs: Meridian beat Jackson, four to two gamesEl Dorado Oilers beat Pine Bluff, four to zero gamesFinal series: Meridian beat El Dorado, four to zero games
 1954 – Greenville TigersPlayoffs:Greenville beat Monroe, four to one gamesEl Dorado Oilers beat Meridian, four to three gamesFinal series: El Dorado beat Greenville, four to two games

Sources

External links
Cotton States League memorabilia
Mike McCann website – Minor League Baseball History

 
Defunct minor baseball leagues in the United States
Defunct professional sports leagues in the United States
Baseball leagues in Alabama
Baseball leagues in Arkansas
Baseball leagues in Florida
Baseball leagues in Louisiana
Baseball leagues in Mississippi
Baseball leagues in Texas
Sports leagues established in 1902
Sports leagues established in 1922
Sports leagues established in 1936
Sports leagues established in 1947
1902 establishments in the United States
1955 disestablishments in the United States
Sports leagues disestablished in 1955